Alejandro Campano Hernando (born 29 December 1978) is a Spanish retired footballer who played mainly as a right midfielder.

Club career
Campano was born in Seville, Andalusia. He amassed La Liga totals of 170 games and 15 goals over the course of six seasons, mainly with RCD Mallorca.

Campano also represented in the competition Gimnàstic de Tarragona, and retired in June 2012 at the age of 33 after one year in the Segunda División with Xerez CD, later working as a sports agent.

Honours
Mallorca
Copa del Rey: 2002–03

References

External links

1978 births
Living people
Spanish footballers
Footballers from Seville
Association football midfielders
La Liga players
Segunda División players
Segunda División B players
Sevilla Atlético players
Atlético Dos Hermanas CF players
RCD Mallorca B players
RCD Mallorca players
Gimnàstic de Tarragona footballers
Xerez CD footballers
Liga I players
FC Vaslui players
Spanish expatriate footballers
Expatriate footballers in Romania
Spanish expatriate sportspeople in Romania